Idaho Legislative District 35 is one of 35 districts of the Idaho Legislature. It is currently represented by Senator Jeff Siddoway, Republican  of Terreton, Representative Van Burtenshaw, Republican of Terreton, and Rod Furniss, Republican of St. Anthony.

District profile (1984–1992) 
From 1984 to 1992, District 35 did not exist.

District profile (1992–2002) 
From 1992 to 2002, District 35 consisted of all of Power County and a portion of Bannock and Bingham Counties.

District profile (2002–2012) 
From 2002 to 2012, District 35 consisted of all of Butte, Clark, Custer, Jefferson, and Lemhi and a portion of Fremont County.

District profile (2012–present) 
District 35 currently consists of all of Butte, Clark, Fremont, and Jefferson Counties.

See also

 List of Idaho Senators
 List of Idaho State Representatives

References

External links
Idaho Legislative District Map (with members)
Idaho Legislature (official site)

35
Butte County, Idaho
Clark County, Idaho
Fremont County, Idaho
Jefferson County, Idaho